John Blunden (c. 1695 – 8 January 1752) was an Irish politician.

He was named after his father and entered the Irish House of Commons in 1727, sitting for Kilkenny City until his death in 1752. Blunden married Martha Cuffe, only surviving daughter of Agmondesham Cuffe and sister of John Cuffe, 1st Baron Desart and had by her five sons. His only surviving son John succeeded his father as Member of Parliament.

References

1690s births
1752 deaths
Irish MPs 1727–1760
Members of the Parliament of Ireland (pre-1801) for County Kilkenny constituencies
Mayors of Kilkenny